Trần Huyền My, also known as Amee (born 23 March 2000) is a Vietnamese singer. She first gained audiences attention in 2019 when she released her debut song "Anh Nhà Ở Đâu Thế" ("Boy, Where do you live?"). She is best known for being the first solo female artist from St.319 Entertainment. She is the youngest Vietnamese artist to have won at the MAMA Awards for "Best New Asian Artist in Vietnam".

Engaged in a musical career since 2018, Amee has a clear voice, and managed to quickly reach young audiences and become popular on social networks. The artist notably proposes a combination of tradition and modernity in her songs with the desire to bring Vietnamese music into world trends.

In addition to "Anh nhà đâu thế?", Amee is also known for her songs "Đen đá không đường" ("Black-Iced-Coffee"), "Sao anh chưa về nhà?" ("Why don't you come home?"), and "Mama Boy". In December 2020, she released her first album dreAMEE and performed the first live acoustic show of the same name with the idea of "healing" her fans with her soft music during the anxious period of the COVID-19 pandemic.

Before winning an award at the MAMA 2020, Amee had already been honored with several national awards such as "Best Video of the Year" at the Metub WebTV Asia Awards 2019, "Best Song" at the Green Wave Awards 2019, "Top 10 Music Video in Vietnam" at YouTube Rewind 2019, "Best New Artist" at the Zing Music Awards 2019 and "New Revelation of the Year" at the Dedication Music Award 2020.

Life and career

Early life 
Amee was born on 23 March 2000 in Hanoi. She was recruited by St.319 Entertainment as a trainee when she was 15 and was one of the first idols in Vietnam to have undergone a training period of four years. During her trainee period, she made an appearance in Nguyễn Trọng Tài, San Ji and Double X's music video "HongKong1".

2018-2019: Career beginnings 
On 15 October 2018, Amee made her official label debut with her appearance in fellow label group Monstar's "Nếu Mai Chia Tay".

Amee then was formally introduced as a solo artist on 13 March 2019 with her solo debut teaser "dreAMEE (intro)" releasing on 1 April 2019. Her first title track "Anh Nhà Ở Đâu Thế" featuring B Ray released on 3 April 2019 which after two days, garnered 2.5 million views on YouTube and was trending second on YouTube Vietnam.

On 14 April 2019, Amee again collaborated with rapper B Ray with song "Ex's Hate Me" which gained her popularity within the Vietnamese community as the song garnered popularity on the YouTube charts five days after the song's release. She then collaborated with Kay Tran on 22 April 2019 with Phố Hàng Nóng.

On 9 May 2019, Amee's second single "Đen Đá Không Đường" which featured B Ray in the Music Video. The video was trending third on YouTube Vietnam. Nine days after on 18 May 2019 also marked the first audio release of Amee's with her EP "dreAMEE" releasing as a timed exclusive on VNG Corporation's music streaming service Zing MP3. The EP was then eventually distributed on international streaming services and music storefronts Spotify, iTunes and Apple Music on 30 July 2019.

Amee marked her first OST debut with Andiez, on 15 July 2019 with Anh Đánh Rơi Người Yêu Này for movie Thật Tuyệt Vời Khi Ở Bên Em. Her fourth collaboration was also released on 12 September 2019 with OSad for "Dấu Yêu Vô Hình".

Amee released her fourth title track on 13 October 2019 with "Trời Giấu Trời Mang Đi". The song featured retired professional League of Legends player and popular Vietnamese internet streamer ViruSs, who wrote the song's music and lyrics. This marked ViruSs' first composed track to be released to the public. "Trời Giấu Trời Mang Đi" was also Amee's biggest breakthrough, garnering 4.5 million views in two days and being Amee's first song to top YouTube trending in Vietnam.

On 5 December 2019, Amee marked her first win in the Vietnamese Music Awards industry for Best Collaboration Music Video of The Year at the METUB WebTVAsia Awards 2019.

2020-present: Award wins, debut album dreAMEE 
Amee continued her award-winning streak on 9 January 2020 at the annual Zing Music Awards (ZMA) for the Best Rookie of the Year award. A week later, on 18 January 2020, her second appearance in an OST was released with Huynh James, titled "Giận Muốn Chết Đến Tết Cũng Quên" for "30 Chưa Phải Là Tết'. During Lunar New Year festivities, Amee also appeared with rookies Han Sara and Xesi to sing Tết Đón Xuân Về at the annual Lunar New Year "Gala Nhac Viet" music show.

On 14 February 2020, Amee was featured on B Ray's EP Loser2Love in the track "Do For Love". The music video was a hit, with the video trending second on YouTube Vietnam for two days. Another featuring track with Amee was released two weeks later, on 25 February 2020 with Lou Hoang and Rhymastic for "1000x(Ngàn Lần)".

Amee scored her third win at a music award show on 3 March 2020 at SCTV2's Làn Sóng Xanh awards for the "Top 10 Most Liked Songs in 2019".

Amee then released her fourth single "Sao Anh Chưa Về Nhà" featuring labelmate and rapper Ricky Star. This music video trended at number 1 on YouTube Vietnam.

Her fifth award was given at the "Giải thưởng Âm nhạc Cống hiến" event (translated as "Prize for Music Devotees", somewhat equivalent to Vietnamese Grammys) for Best New Artist of the Year.

On 18 June 2020, Amee released her fifth single "Yêu Thì Yêu Không Yêu Thì Yêu" which was also announced to be the main track for her new album Dreamee. This track is Amee second single not featuring any other artist, and was trending first on YouTube Vietnam for two days. DreAMEE was released on 28 June 2020.

On 6 December 2020, Amee was awarded the "Best New Asian Artist Vietnam" in MAMA 2020.

Discography

Studio album

Extended plays

Filmography

Awards and nominations

References

External links
 
 
 

21st-century Vietnamese women singers
2000 births
Living people